Marcie  is a fictional character featured in the long-running syndicated daily and Sunday comic strip Peanuts by Charles M. Schulz.

Marcie is a studious girl who is sometimes depicted as being terrible at sports. She is friends with the tomboyish, athletic Peppermint Patty, who gets annoyed at Marcie when she calls her "sir", and she has a mostly unrequited crush on the underdog Charlie Brown.

Marcie has appeared outside the comic strip, and she has been featured in numerous Peanuts television specials, cinematic films, theatrical plays, and video games.

History
Marcie made her first appearance in the daily strip from July 20, 1971, but her name wasn't mentioned until the strip from October 11. The character was modeled after Elise Gallaway, the roommate of Patty Swanson, Charles M. Schulz's cousin and the inspiration for the Peppermint Patty character.

Marcie made her debut on television in the 1973 special There's No Time for Love, Charlie Brown.  A forerunner of Marcie's character, a girl named Clara, made an appearance in a sequence at a girls’ camp in June 1968.  As Marcie became a part of the regular cast, she appeared in the same class as Peppermint Patty, sitting in the desk behind her.

Schulz never gave Marcie a surname in the comic strip. However, she has been given two surnames in animated features. In the 1994 animated special You're In the Super Bowl, Charlie Brown, Marcie's surname is given as "Johnson".  In 2015's The Peanuts Movie, for which Schulz's son, Craig Schulz, and Schulz's grandson, Bryan Schulz, were included among the film's writers and producers, her name is shown to be "Marcie Carlin".

Marcie is a soft-spoken voice of reason to Peppermint Patty. For example, in the 1973 Emmy Award winning special A Charlie Brown Thanksgiving; when Peppermint Patty throws a tantrum about the "dinner" Charlie Brown made for them, Marcie gently reminds her that he didn't invite her to dinner but that Patty invited herself. However, Marcie is sometimes portrayed as being somewhat naive. In It's the Easter Beagle, Charlie Brown, Marcie shows complete ineptitude in the kitchen, making several unsuccessful attempts at preparing eggs to color for Easter, and then later biting into one without removing the shell first (saying "Tastes terrible, sir"), all to Peppermint Patty's great consternation.

Later, Marcie was portrayed as an overachiever (she once quipped that she had already chosen her college and enrolled her three children in preschool) and academically the brightest of the Peanuts cast. Even so, she is possibly the most credulous of the gang. She apparently is under a great deal of pressure from her parents to excel in school, and, in a story in 1990, sought refuge from her demanding parents at Charlie Brown's house and fell asleep on his couch.

The first actor to perform Marcie's voice in the TV specials was a boy, James Ahrens, from 1973 to 1977. Various others have played Marcie since. As with all of the Peanuts performers who were too young to read a script, director Bill Melendez sometimes had to speak the children's lines to them. Melendez (who had a distinct Mexican accent) noted with amusement that some of the performers for Marcie imitated his reading so closely, they repeated his accented "Charlce" instead of "Charles".

Appearance 
Marcie wears round glasses with opaque lenses and wears her dark brown (sometimes black) hair in a short bob style. She also wears an orange t-shirt (colored red in the specials and The Peanuts Movie). She and Peppermint Patty were the only girls in the strip to wear a t-shirt and shorts (although Lucy and Sally wore pants during the winter in the 1990s’ strips, and Eudora wore pants regularly).

Personality
Marcie is best friends with Peppermint Patty, constantly addressing her as "sir" (she called her "sir" in her first line in the strip). Originally, Peppermint Patty kept telling Marcie to stop calling her that but eventually grows accustomed to it. Initially, Peppermint Patty addresses Marcie as "dorky" and, when talking to others, refers to her as "my weird friend from camp".

Voice actors 
Marcie has been played by many voice actors in animated Peanuts productions.

 Jimmy Ahrens (1973–1977)
 Casey Carlson (1977–1981)
 Shannon Cohn (1980–1982)
 Michael Dockery (1983, 1985)
 Keri Houlihan (1984–1986, 1988)
 Jason Mendelson (1986)
 Tani Taylor Powers (1988)
 Marie Cole (1989)
 Lindsay Benesh (1992)
 Nicole Fisher (1994–1997)
 Ashley Edner (2000)
 Jessica D. Stone (2002)
 Melissa Montoya (2003)
 Jessica Gordon (2006)
 Rebecca Bloom (2015)
 Taylor Autumn Bertman (2016)
 Vasi Chris (2018–2019)
 Holly Gorski (2019–present)

References

External links

 

Peanuts characters
Comics characters introduced in 1971
Child characters in comics
Female characters in animation
Female characters in comics
Comic book sidekicks
Child characters in television